This is a list of Fayetteville State Broncos football players in the NFL Draft.

Key

Selections

References

Fayetteville State Broncos

Fayetteville State Broncos NFL Draft